Camporotondo Etneo is a comune (municipality) in the Metropolitan City of Catania in the Italian region Sicily, located about  southeast of Palermo and about  northwest of Catania.  

Camporotondo Etneo borders the following municipalities: Belpasso, Misterbianco, Motta Sant'Anastasia, San Pietro Clarenza.

History 

The historical origins of the comune of Camporotondo Etneo go back to the 17th century when the marquise Diego Reitano obtained its property from Antonio Reitano. At that time the name of the town was not Camporotondo Etneo but Camporeale. Reitano was married with Teresa Mauroli, a noblewoman originary from Messina. In 1730, Camporotondo was a marquisate and, in 1733, Reitano became senator of Messina. In the 17th century, the high number of eruptions deeply altered the morphology of the land surrounding Camporeale leading to the decision to change the town name into Camporotondo.

References

Cities and towns in Sicily